The 1962 Lamar Tech Cardinals football team represented Lamar State College of Technology—now known as Lamar University—as a member of the Lone Star Conference (LSC) during the 1962 NCAA College Division football season. Led by James B. Higgins in his tenth and final season as head coach, the Cardinals compiled an overall record of an 7–3 with a mark of 4–3 in conference play, placing fourth in the LSC. Lamar Tech played home games at Greenie Stadium in Beaumont, Texas.

1962 was the program's final final season as a member of the Lone Star Conference. Lamar Tech competed as an independent in 1963 and joined the Southland Conference in 1964. Higgins was named NCAA College Division Coach of the Year for Region VII following the season. He remained at Lamar as athletic director until 1982.

Schedule

References

Lamar Tech
Lamar Cardinals football seasons
Lamar Tech Cardinals football